Eremophila rugosa is a flowering plant in the figwort family, Scrophulariaceae and is endemic to Western Australia. It is an erect shrub with sticky, shiny leaves and pink, purple or mauve flowers.

Description
Its branches and leaves are sticky and shiny due to the presence of resin. The branches are ribbed and have fine, branched hairs but these are usually obscured by resin.

The petal tube is pink, purple or mauve on the outside, white with lilac-coloured spots inside. There are scattered glandular hairs on the petal tube and the inside of the tube is filled with long, soft hairs. The 4 stamens are enclosed in the petal tube.

Taxonomy and naming 
Eremophila rugosa was first formally described by Robert Chinnock in 2007 and the description was published in Eremophila and Allied Genera: A Monograph of the Plant Family Myoporaceae. The specific epithet (rugosa) is a Latin word meaning "wrinkled" or "creased" referring to the wrinkled branches, leaves and fruit.

Distribution and habitat 
This eremophila grows in loamy soils in Eucalyptus woodland on undulating plains between Norseman and Coolgardie in the Coolgardie and Murchison biogeographic regions.

Conservation
Eremophila rugosa is classified as "not threatened" by the Western Australian Government Department of Parks and Wildlife.

Use in horticulture
This very hardy shrub has a massed display of pink, blue or purple flowers from late winter to spring but requires very little maintenance. It can be propagated from cuttings and grown in a wide range of soils including alkaline soil and heavy clay. It grows well in full sun or part shade, is drought tolerant and recovers quickly from damage caused by severe frost.

References

Eudicots of Western Australia
rugosa
Endemic flora of Western Australia
Plants described in 2007
Taxa named by Robert Chinnock